Isil is a locality and decentralized municipal entity located in the municipality of Alt Àneu, in Province of Lleida province, Catalonia, Spain. As of 2020, it has a population of 74.

Geography 
Isil is located 173km north-northeast of Lleida.

References

Populated places in the Province of Lleida